Maximilian Wöber (born 4 February 1998) is an Austrian professional footballer who plays as a centre back for Premier League club Leeds United and the Austria national team.

Club career

Youth career
Born in Vienna, Wöber started his football career with Rapid Wien's youth teams.

Rapid Wien
In 2015, Wöber was called up for Rapid Wien's first team. On 25 February 2016, he made his senior team debut in the Round of 32 of 2015–16 UEFA Europa League against Valencia at Ernst-Happel-Stadion, playing the game as a starter for full-time game by coach Zoran Barisic.

Ajax
In August 2017, Wöber signed a four-year contract with Dutch side Ajax. The club paid a transfer fee of €7.5 million to Rapid Wien.

Sevilla
On 11 January 2019, Spanish La Liga side Sevilla reached an agreement with Ajax for the transfer of Wöber, He signed a contract until 2023, initially joining on loan with an obligatory buyout clause, for a reported fee of €10.5 million. He made his debut on 26 January 2019, starting in a 5–0 win against Levante.

Red Bull Salzburg
On 13 August 2019, Wöber agreed to a five-year contract with Austrian side FC Red Bull Salzburg for a reported fee of €12 million, making him the most expensive player in Austrian Bundesliga.

Leeds United 
On 3 January 2023, Wöber signed a four-and-a-half year contract with English Premier League club Leeds United for an undisclosed fee.

On 8 January 2023 Wöber made his debut in the FA Cup third round 2-2 draw against Cardiff City as a second-half substitute. On 13 January 2023 he made his Premier League debut in the 2-1 defeat to Aston Villa.

International career
Wöber got his first call up to the senior Austria side for 2018 FIFA World Cup qualifiers against Wales and Georgia in September 2017. On 6 October 2017, he made his debut for the Austria national team in a 3–2 win against Serbia.

Career statistics

Club

International

Honours
Ajax
Eredivisie: 2018–19
KNVB Cup: 2018–19

Red Bull Salzburg
Austrian Bundesliga: 2019–20, 2020–21, 2021–22
Austrian Cup: 2019–20, 2019–20, 2021–22

References

External links
 
 

Living people
1998 births
Association football defenders
Austrian footballers
Austria international footballers
Austria youth international footballers
SK Rapid Wien players
AFC Ajax players
Jong Ajax players
Sevilla FC players
Austrian Football Bundesliga players
Eredivisie players
Eerste Divisie players
La Liga players
Premier League players
FC Red Bull Salzburg players
Austrian expatriate footballers
Expatriate footballers in the Netherlands
Expatriate footballers in Spain
Expatriate footballers in England
Austrian expatriate sportspeople in Spain
Austrian expatriate sportspeople in the Netherlands
Leeds United F.C. players
Austrian expatriate sportspeople in England